WWF WrestleMania: Steel Cage Challenge is a professional wrestling video game based on the World Wrestling Federation (WWF), released in 1992 by Acclaim Entertainment for the Nintendo Entertainment System and in 1993 for the Master System and the Game Gear handheld console. The NES version was subsequently released as a handheld TV game in 2018 under the name WWE WrestleMania: Steel Cage Challenge, with all references to the "WWF" name and logo replaced by "WWE" (and with two changes to the roster).

Gameplay

Modes include One-on-One (regular match and steel cage match variations), Tag Team, WWF Championship (choose one wrestler and defeat all the others to become WWF Champion), and Tag Team Championship (choose two wrestlers and defeat combinations of the rest in a series of tag team matches to become WWF Tag Team Champions).

Roster

Ten wrestlers are playable. The NES and Sega versions of the game feature Hulk Hogan, Randy Savage, Ted DiBiase, I.R.S., Bret Hart, and The Undertaker. The NES version also has Jake Roberts, Sid Justice, Roddy Piper, and The Mountie. The Sega versions replace those characters with Ric Flair, Papa Shango, Shawn Michaels and Tatanka. The TV game version features the NES roster, but with Ultimate Warrior and Razor Ramon replacing Hulk Hogan and The Mountie respectively.

All wrestlers share the same moveset, consisting of standard punches and kicks, grapples (body slam, throw, headbutt), running attacks (flying clothesline, dropkick), a powerslam to a running opponent, ground attacks (stomp, elbow drop) and a move off the turnbuckle. There are no finishing moves. However, this was the first WWF console-based game to feature a steel cage match (cage matches had previously been seen in the arcade game WWF WrestleFest).

Reception

The Game Gear version of WWF WrestleMania: Steel Cage Challenge received a score of 53% from Sega Master Force.

See also
List of licensed wrestling video games
List of fighting games

References

External links

1992 video games
Acclaim Entertainment games
LJN games
Nintendo Entertainment System games
Game Gear games
Master System games
WrestleMania video games
WWE video games
Multiplayer and single-player video games
Professional wrestling games
Video games developed in the United States
Video games scored by Matt Furniss